Tuluva Hebbars are a Tulu-speaking Brahmin community from Karnataka, India.  The name "Hebbar" comes from the Kannada, "hebbu/hiridhu" (meaning big) + "haruva" (meaning Brahmin).

The Tuluva Hebbar community is originally from Puttur, Dakshina Kannada district, Karnataka. Their mother tongue is Tulu, which is one of the Dravidian languages of India. People from this Tulu-speaking Brahmin community have a lot of representation & noted works in the field of medicine, engineering, law and finance. They are closely related to Sthanika Brahmins. 
 
These Hebbars have been working as 'Patels' (village officers), ministers, financial advisors and many of them worship in the temples of Kerala and Karnataka. Some of them are engaged in the Agricultural Industry, 'Visha vaidya' - Treatment for Snake bites. Some families are engaged in practicing Ayurveda medicine. Some of them were engaged in Nrittam - a kind of dance performed in temples where the deity is placed on the head of the dancer. 

Karnataka society
Hebbars
Hebbars
Indian castes
Mangalorean society
Social groups of Karnataka
Few  Hebbar families are also royals. They formally were kings and local rulers.